The Polygon Gallery (formerly known as the Presentation House Gallery) is an art gallery in North Vancouver, British Columbia, Canada.  It is the largest non-profit photographic gallery in Western Canada and has operated since 1981

Work began on the new gallery in early 2016, which was designed by Patkau Architects. Costing $18 million, the gallery opened to the public on November 18, 2017. The Polygon Gallery consists of 25,000-square-feet of exhibit space across two levels with a café and gift shop.

References

Art museums and galleries in British Columbia
Companies based in British Columbia
1981 establishments in British Columbia
Art galleries established in 1981
Photography museums and galleries in Canada
North Vancouver (city)